Barks is an unincorporated community in south-central St. Mary's Township in Perry County, Missouri, United States. Barks is situated in the northeastern part of Perry County. A post office was established in 1899, and remained in operation until 1919.

References

Unincorporated communities in Perry County, Missouri
Unincorporated communities in Missouri